HD 92945 is a K-type main sequence star in the constellation of Hydra.  Its apparent visual magnitude varies by 0.02 magnitudes and is approximately 7.72 at maximum brightness.

Debris disk
In 2007, a debris disk with estimated dust mass 0.047  has been observed around the star by coronagraphic imaging, using the ACS and NICMOS instruments on the Hubble Space Telescope.  It appears to extend 45 to 175 astronomical units from HD 92945.

The disk has a gap at radius 73 AU which may be carved by the planet, but no planet with mass exceeding 1-2  was observed in the gap.

References

Hydra (constellation)
K-type main-sequence stars
092945
052462
3615
Hydrae, V419
CPD−28 4175
J10432828-2903513
Hypothetical planetary systems
Circumstellar disks